The Audio Information Network of Colorado (AINC), formerly the Radio Reading Service of the Rockies (RRSR), was founded in 1990. It is based in Boulder, Colorado, United States, and is a non-profit, community and volunteer-based, radio reading service and audio information service for blind, visually impaired, and print-handicapped people in the state of Colorado. AINC provides access to printed material through sound recordings by volunteers.

The executive director is Kim Ann Wardlow.

References

External links 

Organizations established in 1990
Non-profit organizations based in Colorado
Mass media in Boulder, Colorado
Mass media in Colorado
Radio reading services of the United States
1990 establishments in Colorado